Sophie Auster (born July 6, 1987) is an American singer/songwriter and actress. She is the daughter of authors Paul Auster and Siri Hustvedt.

Early life
Sophie Auster was born in Brooklyn, New York City, the daughter of authors Paul Auster and Siri Hustvedt.

At the age of eight, Auster began studying music and classical voice. A year later, at the age of nine, she was cast in the Agnieszka Holland film Washington Square starring Jennifer Jason Leigh, Albert Finney, Maggie Smith and Ben Chaplin. After her early professional experiences, Sophie began acting lessons at the Lee Strasberg Theatre and Film Institute. As a teenager, Auster performed jazz standards at local New York clubs and was a member of an off-Broadway troupe at The Gene Frankel Theater in downtown Manhattan.

Career
Auster was sixteen when she recorded her first record. The album was a collaboration between her and Brooklyn-based musicians Michael Hearst and Joshua Camp of the musical duo One Ring Zero. Using her writer father, Paul Auster's, early translations of French Surrealist poets, along with two original lyrics written by Auster herself, the poetic lines of Tristan Tzara, Paul Eluard, Robert Desnos, Philippe Soupault and Guillaume Apollinaire became songs set to music by Hearst and Camp.

The collaboration began as a side project Auster pursued after school and on weekends. It was never intended for wide public consumption, but when a family friend heard the album, she was so impressed that she offered to release it on the French label Naïve Records. The album quickly made its way from France into other countries in Europe and beyond. Her subsequent self-titled album is Sophie Auster.

In July 2006, Auster was on the cover of the Spanish issue of Rolling Stone magazine. In 2007, Auster began writing with writer/musician Barry Reynolds. The two have collaborated on many songs. After graduating from Sarah Lawrence College in 2010, Auster began recording again. Her self-produced E.P., "Red Weather", was released November 13, 2012, through Lost Colony Music. Auster's full-length LP, Dogs and Men, was released in June 2015 via Sony Red.  "Dogs and Men" came out to rave reviews. The New York Times praised it for its "sultry, folksy vocals" and W Magazine called it "soaring". In 2016 Sophie was a grand prize recipient in The John Lennon Songwriting Contest for her song "Little Bird". In October 2017, Sophie won the Cosmopolitan Magazine singer of the year award in Spain. She appeared on the cover of Cosmopolitan Magazine, Spanish edition, in the March 2018 music issue. Auster also wrote a feminist column for Vanity Fair in Spain for a year.

In 2016, Auster began work on her last full length album, Next Time, with producer Tore Johansson. Introduced by fellow songwriter, Nicole Atkins, Sophie packed her bags and left to record her album with Johansson in Malmo, Sweden. Secluded in the Swedish countryside, Johansson and Auster, alongside musician and producer assistant, Martin Gjerstadd worked steadily for months to record and mix the album. After shopping the completed album around for over a year to different labels, Sophie was then signed to a recording and publishing contract with BMG Music worldwide, and Next Time was released in April 2019. Sophie toured the album extensively around Europe and the United States. She subsequently opened for Rock and Roll Hall of Fame inductee Bryan Ferry in the summer of 2019. The lead single, "Mexico", off Next Time will be featured in the upcoming John Turturro film The Jesus Rolls. The film had its world premiere at The Rome Film Festival on October 16, 2019. It is scheduled to be released on February 28, 2020, by Screen Media Films. The film stars Susan Sarandon, Bobby Cannavale, Audrey Tautou, Pete Davidson, and Christopher Walken.

After touring, Auster jumped back into the studio with Brooklyn based producer Daniel Schlett. The two worked together to create a more progressive pop sound for the indie songstress. In November 2019, the two song EP entitled "History Happens at Night" was released via BMG Music. An accompanying music video for the single "If I Could" followed, starring trans activist and actress, Jari Jones, and Are You the One? MTV alum, Basit Shittu. The video was premiered on V Magazine's website in November 2019 and is directed by Auster's photographer husband, Spencer Ostrander, and cinematographer, Theodore King. She is currently working on new music in New York City.

Discography

Filmography

References

External links

Artist's website

1987 births
Living people
Musicians from Brooklyn
Actresses from New York City
Singers from New York City
American women singer-songwriters
American alternative rock musicians
American people of Norwegian descent
American people of Polish-Jewish descent
Sarah Lawrence College alumni
21st-century American actresses
21st-century American women singers
Singer-songwriters from New York (state)